Pentewan (meaning foot of the radiant stream) is a coastal village and former port in south Cornwall, England, United Kingdom.

 
Pentewan is in the civil parish of Pentewan Valley and the ecclesiastical parish of St Austell.

Pentewan lies within the Cornwall Area of Outstanding Natural Beauty (AONB).

Village and harbour
The village and its harbour date back to medieval times, when Pentewan was mainly a fishing community, with some stone-quarrying, tin-streaming, and agriculture. Leland, writing in 1549, referred briefly to 'Pentowan' as "a sandy bay witherto fischer bootes repair for socour". Between 1818 and 1826, local land- and quarry owner Sir Christopher Hawkins substantially rebuilt the harbour, partly to improve the existing pilchard-fishery and partly to turn the village into a major china clay port. At its peak, Pentewan shipped a third of Cornwall's china clay, but continual problems with silting (caused by tin and clay mining) and the rise of the rival ports of Charlestown and Par Docks meant that Pentewan's status as a port lasted for little more than a century. The last trading ship left in 1940. After that, the harbour entrance gradually silted up, though it was still possible for small boats to enter the harbour in the 1960s. Now, although the water-filled basin remains, Pentewan harbour is entirely cut off from the sea.

Tramway and railway
In 1829, Sir Christopher Hawkins made further improvements by linking the harbour to St Austell by means of a horse-drawn tramway that hauled china clay from the quarries on St Austell moor and tin from the Polgooth mines for shipment from Pentewan. Coal was shipped in and transported to the mines and (later) to the St Austell gasworks. In 1874, the engineer John Barraclough Fell replaced the tramway with a narrow gauge railway. This operated until 1918, when the rails and locomotives were requisitioned by the War Office. The Pentewan Railway was almost entirely a mineral line, but did occasionally transport passengers on special excursions. A Sunday school outing was described by A.L. Rowse in his memories of a Cornish childhood. Part of the old railway line, from London Apprentice to Pentewan, is now a footpath and cycle path.

Mines and quarries

Pentewan stone
Pentewan Quarry was the source of a fine building stone, a variety of elvan. Many medieval churches in Cornwall, including those at Botusfleming, Duloe, Fowey, Golant, Gorran, Lostwithiel, Mevagissey, St Austell, and St Columb Major, were wholly or partly constructed out of the stone, as were some later buildings such as the eighteenth century Antony House. In 1985 blocks of Pentewan stone were recovered from the beach near the quarry to restore St Austell church.

Tin mining
'Happy-Union', a stream work for tin, was opened near Pentewan in 1780 and was worked down the valley towards the sea. A second working, 'Wheal Virgin', went up the valley. The tin streamers considered both to be places where "the old men had been", since they uncovered charcoal ashes, human remains, and bones of animals "of a different description from any now known in Britain". John William Colenso (father of the bishop of the same name) invested his capital into these workings but the speculation proved to be ruinous when the investment was lost following a sea flood. The Happy-Union closed in 1837, Wheal Virgin around 1874.

History

The Domesday Book and the Manor of Pentewan
Pentewan was originally known as 'Lower Pentewan', 'Higher Pentewan' being a separate and earlier settlement to the south-west of the village, centred on Barton Farm. In 1086, Higher Pentewan was listed in the Domesday Book as the Manor of 'Bentewoin', one of many Cornish manors held by Robert, Comte de Mortain. It was subsequently held by the families of Pentire, Roscarrock, Dart, and Robartes (the Earls of Radnor), then by Sir James La Roche, the MP for Bodmin (1768–80), and (in 1792) by the Rev. Henry Hawkins Tremayne of nearby Heligan.

Natural History of Pentewan
Pentewan was likely once visited by gray whale (Eschrichtius robustus) as 2 of the 7 European gray whale fossils were found here. The gray whale prefers shallow seas and the shallow seas over the continental shelf of the South Western Approaches is one of the widest in north-western Europe. The first gray whale to be seen in the Atlantic in centuries was sighted in 2010. The Northwest Passage was then ice-free and so apparently a gray whale from the Pacific Ocean made it to Europe. More whales are likely to follow. In 2005 it was proposed to reintroduce them to Pentewan, which would likely attract throngs of tourists to the beaches.

The submerged forests of Pentewan are another interesting part of its past natural history. This forest was submerged so quickly that oysters are now found fastened to its tree stumps.

Second World War
A pill box was erected in the harbour and the beach mined as part of the dragon's teeth anti-tank defences. Bombs fell near Pentewan in 1941 and an air raid on the port in August 1942 destroyed the Methodist chapel and damaged several houses.

The village today

Since 1945, Pentewan has been dominated by the large 'Pentewan Sands' caravan and camping site that covers much of the beach to the west.  The village itself contains the Ship Inn (owned by the St Austell Brewery), a post office, and several shops. Pentewan Board School, designed and built in 1877/78 by Silvanus Trevail, is now a restaurant. Many of the older buildings, as well as the harbour, are constructed out of Pentewan stone. Some – including All Saints Church, completed in 1821 – were built by Sir Christopher Hawkins as part of his long campaign to improve the village. A former village pub was named The Hawkins Arms, but has now been converted to a guest house called 'Piskey Cove'. Tourism is the only substantial industry remaining in the village. Session guitarist Tim Renwick is a Pentewan resident.

References

External links

 

Villages in Cornwall
Populated coastal places in Cornwall
Ports and harbours of Cornwall
Beaches of Cornwall
Manors in Cornwall